Ebert Field is a softball field located in Kalamazoo, Michigan, United States, and home to the Western Michigan University softball team.  The field is named in honor of Fran Ebert, who started the WMU softball program in 1976.  The stadium seats 400 fans in bleacher seating behind home plate and the first base side.

The field underwent extensive renovations in 2000 and 2001.  The renovations improved the dugouts, wind screens, bullpen and batting cage areas.  A new scoreboard was also installed.

External links 
Ebert Field at Western Michigan University Facilities

Western Michigan Broncos softball
Sports venues in Michigan
College softball venues in the United States
Buildings and structures in Kalamazoo, Michigan
Sports in Kalamazoo, Michigan